Gerard Etifier (born September 10, 1949), better known by his ring name as Gerry Morrow, is a Martinique-born Canadian professional wrestler. He is the brother of Eddie Morrow.

Championships and accomplishments 
Atlantic Grand Prix Wrestling
AGPW North American Tag Team Championship (1 time); with Cuban Assassin
Canadian Rocky Mountain Wrestling
Canadian Rocky Mountain Wrestling North American Heavyweight Title (1 time)

International Championship Wrestling
International Championship Wrestling Tag Team Title (2 times) - with Sumito (1 time), Gama Singh (1 time) 

NWA All-Star Wrestling
NWA Canadian Tag Team Championship (Vancouver version) (1 time) - with Eddie Morrow
Stampede Wrestling
Stampede International Tag Team Championship (7 times) - with Eddie Morrow (3 times), George Wells (1 time), Makhan Singh (1 time), Cuban Assassin (2 times) 

World Wrestling Council
WWC North American Tag Team Championship (1 time) – with Cuban Assassin
WWC World Tag Team Championship (1 time) – with Cuban Assassin
WWC Caribbean Tag Team Championship (1 time) – with Cuban Assassin

West Four Wrestling Alliance
WFWA Canadian Heavyweight Championship (1 time)

References

External links
The Internet Wrestling Database - Jerry Morrow

1949 births
French male professional wrestlers
Living people
Stampede Wrestling alumni
Stampede Wrestling International Tag Team Champions